

Spectacle Lake is a locality in the Australian state of South Australia located in the Riverland on the northern side of the Murray River about  north-east of the Adelaide city centre and about  northwest of Loxton.  Its boundaries were created in August 1999 along with the selection of its name which was derived from the Spectacle Lakes, a lake system which is situated within the locality on the floodplain of the Murray River.  In 2014, a portion of Spectacle Lake was removed and added to the adjoining locality of Loveday to ensure the full extent of Nynes Island is within Loveday.  As of 2012, the land use within Spectacle Lake was divided between conservation and agriculture with the former being concerned with the floodplain.  Spectacle Lake is located within the federal division of Barker, the state electoral district of Chaffey and the unincorporated area of South Australia.

See also
Spectacle Lake (disambiguation)

References

Towns in South Australia
Places in the unincorporated areas of South Australia
Riverland